Torau is an Austronesian language spoken on the east coast of Bougainville, Papua New Guinea.

External links 
 Paradisec has a number of collections that include Torau language materials.

References

Northwest Solomonic languages
Languages of Papua New Guinea
Languages of the Autonomous Region of Bougainville